Sir Henry Edward Duke, 1st Baron Merrivale  (5 November 1855 – 20 May 1939) was a British judge and Conservative politician. He served as Chief Secretary for Ireland between 1916 and 1918.

Background and education
Duke was the second son of William Edward Duke, a granite merchant of Merrivale, Devon, and his wife Elizabeth Ann (née Lord). From a modest background, he was educated locally and did not attend a public school or university.

Legal career
In early life Duke worked as a journalist for the local newspaper the Western Morning News, but at the age of 25 he came to London to cover the House of Commons. While in London he began to study law, and was called to the Bar, Gray's Inn, in 1885. He at first worked on the Western circuit but later established a successful legal practice in London. He was a recorder for Devonport and Plymouth from 1897 to 1900 and for Devonport alone until 1914, and was made a Queen's Counsel in 1899.

Political career
In 1900 Duke was elected to the House of Commons for Plymouth as a Unionist, a seat he held until 1906 when he was defeated. He returned to Parliament in the January 1910 general election as the representative for Exeter. He lost the seat in the December 1910 election by only four votes, but regained it by a single vote after an election petition in April 1911 due to closeness of the result, and held it until 1918 when he resigned for the appointment of Lord Justice of Appeal.

Duke sat on the front opposition bench during the early years of the First World War and was admitted to the Privy Council in 1915. In July 1916 he was appointed by Prime Minister H. H. Asquith to succeed Augustine Birrell as Chief Secretary for Ireland, with a seat in the cabinet, after Birrell had resigned due to the consequences of the Easter Rising. The political situation in Ireland remained strained during Duke's tenure as Chief Secretary, notably over the Conscription Crisis of 1918, and he resigned in May 1918.

Judicial career
After his resignation Duke was knighted and appointed a Lord Justice of Appeal. In 1919 he was made President of the Probate, Divorce and Admiralty Division of the High Court of Justice, a post he held until 1933. A notable case he decided was Balfour v. Balfour.  He also dissented at the Court of Appeal level in the famous case of Attorney-General v De Keyser's Royal Hotel Ltd, [1919] 2 Ch. 197, 238–255. On 19 January 1925 he was raised to the peerage as Baron Merrivale, of Walkhampton in the County of Devon.

Family
Lord Merrivale married Sarah, daughter of John Shorland, in 1876. They had one son and a daughter. His wife died in 1914. Merrivale survived her by 25 years and died in May 1939, aged 83. He was succeeded in the barony by his only son, Edward.

References

Bibliography
 Kidd, Charles, Williamson, David (eds.) Debrett's Peerage and Baronetage (1990 ed.) (New York: St Martin's Press, 1990)
 Legg, L.G. Wickham (ed.) The Dictionary of National Biography: 1931-1940. Oxford University Press, 1949.
 Burke's Peerage and Baronetage (106th ed.) (London 2002)

External links 
 

1855 births
1939 deaths
Barons in the Peerage of the United Kingdom
Duke, Henry
Lords Justices of Appeal
Duke, Henry
Duke, Henry
Members of the Privy Council of the United Kingdom
Members of the Privy Council of Ireland
Members of Gray's Inn
Duke, Henry
Duke, Henry
Duke, Henry
UK MPs who were granted peerages
Duke, Henry
Duke, Henry
Knights Bachelor
Probate, Divorce and Admiralty Division judges
Members of the Judicial Committee of the Privy Council
Barons created by George V
Presidents of the Probate, Divorce and Admiralty Division